StAR-related lipid transfer domain protein 8 (STARD8) also known as deleted in liver cancer 3 protein (DLC-3) is a protein that in humans is encoded by the STARD8 gene and is a member of the DLC family.

Structure and function
The protein is 1103 amino acids long, which like other DLC proteins consists of a sterile alpha motif (SAM), RhoGAP and a StAR-related lipid-transfer (START) domains.

The protein is a Rho GTPase-activating protein (GAP), a type of protein that regulates members of the Rho family of GTPases.  STARD8 is characterized as activating Rho GTPases.  Its expression inhibits the growth of human breast and prostate cancer cells in culture.

Tissue distribution and pathology
The protein is expressed in tissues throughout the body, but is absent or reduced in many kinds of tumor cells.

While there are no known disorders caused by STARD8, partial loss of the STARD8 gene occurs in cases of craniofrontonasal syndrome where the EFNB1 gene (which causes the syndrome) is completely deleted.

Model organisms 

Model organisms have been used in the study of STARD8 function. A conditional knockout mouse line called Stard8tm1b(EUCOMM)Wtsi was generated at the Wellcome Trust Sanger Institute. Male and female animals underwent a standardized phenotypic screen to determine the effects of deletion. Additional screens performed:  - In-depth immunological phenotyping

References

Further reading 

 
 
 
 
 

Genes on human chromosome X